There are over 20,000 Grade II* listed buildings in England.  This page is a list of these buildings in Charnwood.

Charnwood

|}

Notes

External links

 Charnwood
listed buildings
Borough of Charnwood